Foodily.com was a social networking platform built on top of a recipe search engine. It offered a way to search for and find and share recipes through social media as well as from other web sites. However, it is no longer possible to search for recipes, and the site simply gives the notice that the system is unavailable.

History
Foodily.com was co-founded by former Yahoo! veterans. It was launched as a web service on February 1, 2011. In November 2011, Foodily went mobile with the launch of its free iPhone app. Foodily was acquired by IAC-owned social network [Ask.fm] in 2015.

Awards
In 2012, Foodily.com won the Webby Award for the best food and beverage site.

See also
 Social networking service
 List of social networking websites

References

Further reading
 Food, I Love You from vimeo.com
 "Foodily: A Social Search Engine Just For Food" from The Huffington Post (February 16, 2011)
 "Foodily Brings Social Goodness And Menu Sharing To Recipe Search Engine" from TechCrunch (February 1, 2011)

External links
 Foodily.com
 The Foodily blog

American social networking websites
American cooking websites